Marta Maria García Orge (born 13 November 1993) is a Spanish figure skater. After winning the silver medal at the 2014 Spanish Championships, she was assigned to the 2014 European Championships where she qualified for the free skate. García has one senior international medal, bronze from the 2014 Toruń Cup.

Programs

Competitive highlights

References

External links 

 
 Marta García at Tracings

1993 births
Spanish female single skaters
Living people
Sportspeople from Seville